Triin Narva (born November 12, 1994) is an Estonian chess player who holds the title of Woman FIDE Master (2016).

Biography
Narva was born into a chess playing family. She is the granddaughter of Estonian chess champion Boris Rõtov and Woman International Correspondence Chess Grandmaster Merike Rõtova. Her father Jaan Narva is FIDE master, while both her mother Regina Narva and her sister Mai Narva have won the Estonian Women's Chess Championship.

Chess career
From 2004 to 2011, Narva won twelve Estonian Junior Chess Championships in different age groups (U10, U12, U14, U16, U18). From 2003 to 2012 she participated in the European Junior Chess Championships and the World Junior Chess Championships in different age groups. Her best result was a 3rd place at the European Junior Chess Blitz Championship in the group under 18 years (2012). She has won 3 silver (2010, 2011, 2012) and 4 bronze medals (2009, 2014, 2020, 2021) in the Estonian Women's Championship. Narva also won the Estonian Rapid and Blitz Chess Championships in 2010.

Narva played for Estonia in four Chess Olympiads:
 2010, on the reserve board in the 39th Chess Olympiad in Khanty-Mansiysk (+5 −2 =0);
 2012, on the third board in the 40th Chess Olympiad in Istanbul (+3 −3 =3);
 2014, on the third board in the 41st Chess Olympiad in Tromsø (+4 −3 =4);
 2016, on the fourth board in the 42nd Chess Olympiad in Baku (+7 −0 =2).

Private life
Narva graduated from the Gustav Adolf Grammar School in 2013.

References

External links
 
 
 

1994 births
Living people
Estonian female chess players
Chess Woman FIDE Masters
Estonian people of Russian descent
Sportspeople from Tallinn